The French name Marigot is given to several places in the Caribbean:

Marigot, Dominica, a village in Dominica
Marigot, Grenada, a village in Grenada
Marigot, Saint Martin, the largest settlement on the French side of Saint Martin (Saint-Martin)
Marigot, Saint Barthélemy, a village in Saint Barthélemy
Marigot Bay, Saint Lucia
Le Marigot, a canton in Martinique's La Trinité arrondissement
Marigot, Sud-Est, a beach commune east of Jacmel, Haiti